James William Kelly Jr. (born August 7, 1951) is a former American football tight end who played one season with the Chicago Bears of the National Football League. He played college football at Tennessee State University and attended Columbia Central High School in Columbia, Tennessee.

References

External links
Just Sports Stats

Living people
1951 births
Players of American football from Tennessee
American football tight ends
Tennessee State Tigers football players
Chicago Bears players
People from Columbia, Tennessee